The Social and Radical Left (GSR) was a parliamentary group in the Chamber of Deputies of France during the French Third Republic founded in 1928 by Henry Franklin-Bouillon. The Social-Radicals or Social-Unionists were members of the right-wing of the Radical-Socialist Party who refused a new Cartel des Gauches and supported the conservative coalition led by Raymond Poincaré. Most later became members of the Independent Radicals (PRI) or even the centre-right Democratic Republican Alliance.

See also 
Liberalism and radicalism in France
History of the Left in France
Independent Radicals
Sinistrisme

Defunct political parties in France
Political parties of the French Third Republic
Parliamentary groups in France
Political parties with year of disestablishment missing
1928 establishments in France
Political parties established in 1928